American singer Beyoncé has released seven studio albums, five live albums, three compilation albums, five EPs, one soundtrack album, two karaoke albums, and 83 singles (including 15 as a featured artist, 11 promotional singles and 6 charity singles). To date, Beyoncé has sold over 200 million records worldwide as a solo artist, and a further 60 million as part of Destiny's Child, making her one of the best-selling music artists of all time. Billboard ranked her as the 37th greatest artist of all time.

The Recording Industry Association of America (RIAA) recognized her as the Top Certified Artist of the 2000s decade. According to RIAA, Beyoncé has sold 29.5 million albums and 114 million singles (as a lead artist) in the United States. As of August 2022, the RIAA lists her total certified sales as a solo artist (including features) as over 171 million in the United States. Additionally, Beyoncé has sold 17 million albums in the United States as part of Destiny's Child.

Beyoncé's career began as the lead vocalist of Destiny's Child. She released her first solo album, Dangerously in Love (2003), during the hiatus of Destiny's Child. It debuted at number one on the US Billboard 200 and produced the singles "Crazy in Love", "Baby Boy", "Me, Myself and I", "Naughty Girl" and "The Closer I Get to You". With "Crazy in Love" and Dangerously in Love, Beyoncé became the first female artist—and the fifth artist ever—to top both the singles and albums charts simultaneously in the United States and the United Kingdom. In 2003, "Crazy in Love" and "Baby Boy" peaked at number one on the US Billboard Hot 100 for eight and nine weeks, respectively. Dangerously in Love has sold 11 million copies worldwide.

After the disbandment of Destiny's Child in 2005, Beyoncé released "Check on It" featuring Slim Thug for The Pink Panther soundtrack. The single topped the US Billboard Hot 100 chart for five weeks, and was later included on her second studio album, B'Day (2006), which produced six singles, including top-ten hits "Déjà Vu", "Irreplaceable" and "Beautiful Liar". "Ring the Alarm" became Beyoncé's highest debut on the US Billboard Hot 100 chart, entering at number twelve in 2006, whereas "Irreplaceable" remained at the top of the same chart for ten consecutive weeks in 2006–07, becoming her longest-running single at the pole position of the chart.

Beyoncé's third album, I Am... Sasha Fierce (2008), was a double CD set, intended to reflect the two facets of her personality. It debuted at number one on the US Billboard 200 chart and included the singles "If I Were a Boy", "Single Ladies (Put a Ring on It)" which topped the US Billboard Hot 100 chart for four weeks, "Halo" and "Sweet Dreams". I Am... Sasha Fierce sold 3.12 million copies in the United States, and the album has sold eight million copies worldwide as of 2016. Beyoncé's fourth studio album, 4, was released in June 2011 and debuted atop the US Billboard 200 chart. The album's first two singles, "Run the World (Girls)" and "Best Thing I Never Had", both reached the top ten in several charts worldwide with the latter peaking at number 16 on the Billboard Hot 100, whilst the fourth single "Love on Top" topped the US Hot R&B/Hip-Hop Songs chart for seven consecutive weeks, while peaking at number 20 on the Billboard Hot 100. Beyoncé's self-titled fifth album, Beyoncé, was unexpectedly released to the iTunes Store in December 2013 and debuted atop the US Billboard 200 chart, becoming her fifth consecutive number one album in the United States. After just three days of sales, Beyoncé became the fastest-selling album ever on iTunes, both in the US and worldwide. The album's highest-charting single was "Drunk in Love", which reached number two on the US Billboard Hot 100.

Beyoncé's sixth studio album Lemonade was released on April 23, 2016, after an hour-long accompanying video premiered on HBO. All twelve tracks from Lemonade charted within the Hot 100 in the US, breaking a record previously held by Taylor Swift for most songs by a female artist charting concurrently. The album's  lead single "Formation" became Beyoncé's first top ten single in the US since 2013's "Drunk in Love". Beyoncé's seventh studio album Renaissance was released in July 2022 and debuted atop the Billboard 200, becoming her seventh album to do so. The album's lead single "Break My Soul" peaked at number one in the United States and various other countries worldwide.

Albums

Studio albums

Live albums

Compilation albums

Collaborative albums

Soundtrack albums

Karaoke albums

Extended plays

Singles

As lead artist

As featured artist

Promotional singles

Charity singles

Other charted and certified songs

Guest appearances

See also
 List of songs recorded by Beyoncé
 Destiny's Child discography
 The Carters
 List of songs recorded by Destiny's Child

Notes

References

Discography
Discographies of American artists
Pop music discographies
Rhythm and blues discographies